Ceratophyllus chutsaensis is a species of flea in the family Ceratophyllidae. It was described by Lienchu and Houyong in 1962.

References 

Ceratophyllidae
Insects described in 1962